Cangandala (or Kangandala) is a town and municipality in the province of Malanje (Malange) in Angola.

Cangandala is bordered to the north by the municipalities of Mucari and Malanje (Malange), to the east by the municipality of Cambundi-Catembo, to the south by the municipality of Luquembo, and to the west by the municipality of Mussende.

The municipality contains the comunas (communes) of Cangandala, Caribo, Culamagia and Mbembo.

References

Populated places in Malanje Province
Municipalities of Angola